John Edward Houghton Spaul (1926–2018), sometimes known professionally as J. E. H. Spaul, was a British ancient historian and epigrapher. Much of his work focused on the Army of the Roman Empire.

Education
Spaul was born in Oakham in Rutland. He studied at Durham University, where he edited Palatinate during Michaelmas term of 1948; completed a Diploma of Education (1951), and after some six years of study concurrent to his teaching career, earned his MLitt (1958) from the same institution. His thesis, supervised by Eric Birley, was on the Roman province of Mauretania Tingitana.

Career 
For a period of three years in the 1960s Spaul lived in Blantyre, Malawi, where he was a history teacher at the University of Malawi, before returning to the United Kingdom and settling in Longparish, near Andover, Hampshire.

Publications

Books

 Spaul, John. Ala2: The Auxiliary Cavalry Units of the Pre-Diocletian Imperial Roman Army. Nectoreca Press, 1994.  
 Spaul, John. Cohors2: The evidence for and a short history of the auxiliary infantry units of the Imperial Roman Army. Archaeopress, 2000. 
 Spaul, J. E. H. Classes Imperii Romani : an epigraphic examination of the men of the imperial Roman navy. Nectoreca, 2002.

Articles

 Swinbank, Brenda, and John Edward Houghton Spaul. "The Spacing of the Forts on Hadrian's Wall." Archaeologia Aeliana, no. 29, ser. 4, 1951, pp. 221–238. 4. 
 Spaul, J. E. H. "In Mavretania Tingitana, Svb Volusio Martiale?" Zeitschrift Für Papyrologie Und Epigraphik, vol. 94, 1992, pp. 279–280 
 Spaul, J. E. H. "T.Fl.Neon: A First Century Prefect?" Zeitschrift Für Papyrologie Und Epigraphik, vol. 94, 1992, pp. 281–282 
 Spaul, J. E. H. "A Note on IAM 809 = CIL XVI 182." Zeitschrift Für Papyrologie Und Epigraphik, vol. 96, 1993, pp. 109–110 
 Spaul, J. E. H. "I.A.M. 2,250 = AE 1967,655 and the Identification of Colonia Babba." Zeitschrift Für Papyrologie Und Epigraphik, vol. 103, 1994, pp. 191–201 
 Spaul, J. E. H. "Governors of Tingitana" Antiquités africaines, vol. 30, no. 1, 1994, pp. 235–260. PDF
 Spaul, J. E. H. "Ala I Pannoniorvm: One or Many?" Zeitschrift Für Papyrologie Und Epigraphik, vol. 105, 1995, pp. 63–73

Family life 
In July 1960 he married Marion Spaul (née Nelder), who died in January 2021.

References

1926 births
2018 deaths
English military historians
Historians of ancient Rome
Alumni of Hatfield College, Durham
Academic staff of the University of Malawi